Lesseyton is a town in Enoch Mgijima Local Municipality in the Eastern Cape province of South Africa, located  northwest of Queenstown. Almost all residents are Xhosa speakers. Lesseyton has two schools: Lesseyton Primary School and Ndlovukazi Public High School.

Lesseyton was established as a mission station of the Wesleyan Missionary Society in 1847. The people were all Thembu, who mostly retained their customary cultural and religious beliefs. In 1851, a war broke out between the Xhosas and the Cape colonial authorities, and many Thembus joined the hostilities against the colonial government. The Thembus at Lesseyton, however, remained loyal to the British, and fought the rebellion as part of the "Lesseyton Volunteers".

References

Populated places in the Enoch Mgijima Local Municipality
Populated places established in 1847
1847 establishments in the Cape Colony